Lakyawn (also, Lākyawn) is a village in Chipwi Township, Kachin State, Burma.

References

Populated places in Kachin State
Villages in Myanmar